Stilson Hutchins (November 14, 1838 – April 23, 1912) was an American newspaper reporter and publisher, best known as founder of the broadsheet newspaper The Washington Post.  Hutchins was also a Southern sympathizer and an outspoken racist against African Americans, Native Americans, and other immigrants.

Life and career
Hutchins was born in Whitefield, Coos County, New Hampshire, on November 14, 1838, the son of Stilson Eastman Hutchins and Clara Eaton Hutchins.  He moved to Saint Louis, establishing the Saint Louis Times newspaper in 1866, and became a Missouri state representative for the Democratic Party.  However, before Saint Louis, Stilson lived in Iowa and was employed by the Dubuque Herald.  In 1863 Hutchins became acting editor when Dennis Mahoney was absent.  On April 5, 1863, Stilson Hutchins as acting editor decided to print the following in an editorial in his own words which would deepen the paper's anti-black stance even further:  "Who wants to vote the (xxx)-emancipation ticket? Who wants Iowa covered with indolent blacks? Answer at the polls."

He subsequently moved to Washington, D.C., where he founded The Washington Post to advance Democratic Party views. It was first published on December 6, 1877; within a year, circulation topped 6,000 copies per day. In 1880, Hungarian-born immigrant Joseph Pulitzer joined the staff. He was a lifelong Democrat and his racism and Confederate sympathy never changed before he eventually started to lose mental stability, and bought out the paper's only competitor, The Republican National. He sold The Post in 1889 and the new owners kept the same theme the paper had been delivering until around 1933 when new owners realized that if the paper was to survive it would need to be a serious paper.  In 1919 however, The Washington Post probably hit the wall with its reporting of a black male who raped a white woman, taking the lead in causing what would be known as the 1919 Washington Race Riots, where African Americans were targeted themselves, their homes and businesses.  African Americans would fight back and when it was all over there were several White and Black deaths.

In 1889, Hutchins commissioned a statue of Benjamin Franklin to stand at the corner of Pennsylvania Avenue and 10th street, overlooking what were then the offices of The Washington Post. In 1890, he commissioned a sculpture of Charles Dickens from Francis Edwin Elwell, but backed out of the deal. In 1900, Hutchins also funded Gaetano Trentanove's Daniel Webster Memorial in Scott Circle, Washington, D.C.

In August 1883, Hutchins had leased Governor's Island, on Lake Winnipesaukee in Gilford, New Hampshire, from Isaiah Morrill of Gilford, for $1,000 per year for 99 years, "with the privilege of purchasing the island within twenty years for the sum of $20,000". The arrangement took effect January 1, 1884. Hutchins built a mansion on the island in 1885. In 1897, Hutchins bought Oatlands Plantation in Leesburg, Virginia, but never lived on the property, eventually selling it to William Corcoran Eustis in 1903. In 1903, he leased the mansion to the Ambassador from Germany, Baron Speck von Sternburg, who established a summer embassy there with a retinue of at least 20 persons. The Baron later wrote that the view from the mansion was as magnificent as anything in Switzerland or Bavaria, and that the advertising which he gave the region caused the sale of other summer property. The mansion was sold by the Hutchins family in the late 1920s and burned down on August 1, 1935. While the mansion was once the only one on the island, now there are scores of large private homes.

Hutchins was later the publisher of the first Washington Times (founded 1894 by Rep. Charles G. Conn, and later sold to Frank A. Munsey, who sold it to William Randolph Hearst, who sold it to Eleanor Josephine Medill Patterson ("Cissy" Patterson), who merged it with "Washington Herald" to form the Washington Times-Herald. She was bought out by the Meyer family in 1954, who merged it with the Washington Post.)

Hutchins, died at his home aged 73 in Washington, D.C., on April 23, 1912, and interred at Rock Creek Cemetery.

References

Edward J. Gallagher, Founder of the Washington Post: A Biography of Stilson Hutchins, 1838-1912, Laconia: Citizen Publishing Company, 1965.
Washington Post history
Dex Nilsson, The Names of Washington, D.C., Lafayette: Twinbrook Communications, 1999.

1838 births
1912 deaths
Journalists from Washington, D.C.
American newspaper founders
19th-century American newspaper publishers (people)
The Washington Post publishers
People from Gilford, New Hampshire
People from Whitefield, New Hampshire